Nitidula is a genus of sap-feeding beetles in the family Nitidulidae. There are more than 20 described species in Nitidula. Some species breed in carrion while others are associated with later stages of decay in mammalian corpses and can be used in forensic investigations (e.g., Nitidula carnaria, N. flavomaculata).

Species
These 23 species belong to the genus Nitidula:

 Nitidula aemula Heer, 1862
 Nitidula ancora Heer, 1862
 Nitidula antarctica White, 1846
 Nitidula bipunctata (Linnaeus, 1758) (two-spotted sap beetle)
 Nitidula buprestoides Weber, 1801
 Nitidula carnaria (Schaller, 1783)
 Nitidula convexiuscula Mannerheim, 1843
 Nitidula dubia Gyllenhal, 1808
 Nitidula eremita Audisio, 1990
 Nitidula flavomaculata Rossi, 1790
 Nitidula lateralis White, 1846
 Nitidula maculigera Heer, 1862
 Nitidula melanaria Heer, 1847
 Nitidula nigra Schaeffer, 1911
 Nitidula orbiculata Gyllenhal, 1808
 Nitidula pallida Heer, 1862
 Nitidula prior Scudder, 1900
 Nitidula quadriguttata
 Nitidula radobojana Heer, 1847
 Nitidula robusta Meunier, 1922
 Nitidula rufipes (Linnaeus, 1767)
 Nitidula sulcata Herbst, 1793
 Nitidula ziczac Say, 1825

References

Further reading

External links

 

Nitidulidae
Cucujoidea genera
Taxa named by Johan Christian Fabricius
Articles created by Qbugbot